Sir John Douglas   (5 December 1836 – 22 August 1885) was the Irish-born son of Lt Gen Sir James Dawes Douglas (1795–1862) and Marianne Bullock.

Career
Douglas was in the Civil Service of Mauritius 1859–1869 when he transferred to Ceylon where he was Auditor-General between 1869 and 1876. He became Colonial Secretary of the Straits Settlements on 17 February 1876 – 17 August 1878 before returning to Ceylon as Lieut.-Governor and Colonial Secretary, 1878–1880. He was appointed Acting Governor, 10 July 1883 – 3 December 1883.

Honours
Douglas was appointed Knight Commander of the Order of St Michael and St George (KCMG) in the 1883 Birthday Honours.

Family
Douglas had married, in 1871, Alice Anne, daughter of Right Rev. Piers Calveley Claughton (d. 1884), Bishop of Colombo, Ceylon. They had five children.

Death
Sir John Douglas died in Ceylon on 23 August 1885 and was buried at St Paul's Church, Kandy.

References

1835 births
1885 deaths
British expatriates in Sri Lanka
19th-century British people
British colonial governors and administrators in Africa
Chief Secretaries of Ceylon
Auditors General of Sri Lanka
Governors of British Ceylon
Knights Commander of the Order of St Michael and St George
British Mauritius people
British colonial governors and administrators in Asia
Straits Settlements people
Chief Secretaries of Singapore
Administrators in British Singapore